Campus SuperStar is a Singaporean television music competition to find new singing talent. Contestants are students from secondary schools, junior colleges and institutes of technical education. The first season began airing on MediaCorp Channel U on 2 January, 2006 and ended on 3 April, 2006. The original lineup of judges were Foong Wai See, Cavin Soh and Peter Tan. Li Feihui was brought in as the fourth judge in the first week of semi-final. Hong Junyang, Dasmond Koh and Sugianto hosted the show.

The male category winner, Ng Chee Yang, a sixteen-year-old student from Hwa Chong Institution, was named the inaugural winner of Campus SuperStar, with female category winner Teresa Tseng from CHIJ Katong Convent named the runner-up. Ng received a two-year MediaCorp management contract and a cash prize of $2,000.

Judges and hosts
The original lineup of judges for season one were Y.E.S. 93.3FM programme director Foong Wai See, actor and singer Cavin Soh as well as vocal coach Peter Tan. From the first semi-final round, singer and songwriter Li Feihui brought in as the fourth judge. MediaCorp host Dasmond Koh, as well as Project SuperStar finalists Hong Junyang and Sugianto were announced as the hosts for the show.

Selection process

Applications and first auditions
The audition was opened to students studying in secondary schools, junior colleges or institutes of technical education in Singapore. Auditionees must remain as a student in Singapore throughout the entire competition, from November 2005 to April 2006. Auditions in front of the judges for season 1 took place at Toa Payoh HDB Hub. The first auditions were held on the level 3 of Junction 8 Shopping Centre from 19 to 22 November. There were approximately 4,000 students applied to take part in the auditions. At the end of the first round of auditions, successful auditionees were put through by the judges to the second round of auditions.

Second auditions
The second auditions took place at MediaCorp. The second auditions were held closed-door and there were five judges judging the contestants. At the end of the auditions, a small number of contestants were put through to the third and final round of the auditions.

Third auditions
The third and final round of auditions were held on 13 December, 2005, once again at Junction 8 Shopping Centre. At the end of the third auditions, the judges would select 10 contestants each from the male and female categories to form the final 20. The contestants who were selected as the final 20 were put through to the live shows.

Finalists
Key:
 – Winner
 – Runner-up
 – Gender/Category runner-up
 – Semi-finalist
 – Advanced via Revival

Live shows
The live shows began on 2 January. Each week, the contestants' performances took place on Monday at 8pm and the results were announced on the same night at 11.30pm. Each live show had a different theme.

The live final included performances from Nicholas Teo and Project SuperStar season one winner Kelvin Tan. Lee Shih Shiong and Lee Wei Song were brought in as guest judges during the live final as well.

Results summary
Colour key

Live show details

Week 1: Quarter-final 1 (2 January)
Theme: No theme

Week 2: Quarter-final 2 (9 January)
Theme: No theme

Week 3: Quarter-final 3 (16 January)
Theme: No theme

Week 4: Quarter-final 4 (23 January)
Theme: No theme

Week 5: Quarter-final 5 (6 February)
Theme: No theme
Group performances: "不想长大" (performed by Geraldine See, Clara Tan and Teresa Tseng) and "爱的初体验" (performed by Lee Yin Wei, Ng Chee Yang and Renfred Ng)

Week 6: Quarter-final 6 (13 February)
Theme: No theme
Group performances: "野蛮游戏" (performed by Yvonne Chua, Ng Imm Khim and Ng Yang Ce) and "C'est Si Bon" (performed by Chen Yi Yuan, Hong Yu Yang and Adriano Huang)

Week 7: Revival round (20 February)
Theme: No theme
Group performances: "天灰" (performed by Choo Siew Ping, Sheena Goh, Shermaine Goh, Koh Bee Kwee, Ng Yang Ce and Geraldine See) and "眼泪的味道" (performed by Ho Chee Mun, Alejandro Hou, Adriano Huang, Lee Yin Wei, Kenneth Lim and Samuel Tan)
The first twelve contestants who were eliminated from the first six live shows returned to the stage to perform for the revival round. The contestant who received the highest combined score from either the male and female categories would be reinstated from the competition.

Week 8: Semi-final 1 (27 February)
Theme: No theme

Week 9: Semi-final 2 (6 March)
Theme: No theme

Week 10: Semi-final 3 (13 March)
Theme: Uptempo dance music

Week 11: Semi-final 4 (20 March)
Theme: No theme

Week 12: Final (27 March/2/3 April)
27 March (Prelude)
Group performance: "Hu-La-Hu" (all finalists)
All top 20 finalists returned to the stage in this pre-recorded non-elimination performance show. It featured group performances from the finalists as well as a look-back on their journey in the competition.

2 April (Round 1)
Themes: Designated song; "songs to win the competition"
Group performance: "By Now" (all finalists)
Musical guest: Nicholas Teo ("寂寞边界" and "只因为你")
Music producer and composer Lee Shih Shiong and Lee Wei Song were brought in as the guest judges. Guest hosting roles were also brought in during the live final. It featured Christina Lin reporting from Renfred Ng's school, Peicai Secondary School; Ng Hui from Ng Chee Yang's school, Hwa Chong Institution; Cruz Teng from Geraldine See's school, ITE College West; and Ben Yeo from Teresa Tseng's school, CHIJ Katong Convent.

2 April (Round 2)
Themes: Alumni duets; winner's song
Group performance: "第一天" / "招牌动作" / "绿光" / "Easy Come Easy Go" / "DA DA DA" / "终结孤单" (all finalists except Ng Chee Yang, Renfred Ng, Geraldine See and Teresa Tseng)
Musical guest: Kelvin Tan ("约定" and "触摸")

3 April (After-party)
Group performance: "浪花一朵朵" (all finalists)
All top 20 finalists returned to the stage once again in this live performance show to celebrate the success of the season and the crowning of the winner.

References

External links
 Official website

2006 Singaporean television seasons